Tahirli (also, Tairli) is a village and municipality in the Yardymli Rayon of Azerbaijan.  It has a population of 522.  The municipality consists of the villages of Tahirli and Məlikli.

References 

Populated places in Yardimli District